Union High School District No. 32, known as U-32 High School or U-32, is in East Montpelier, Vermont, United States. It is the regional reform high school for the central Vermont towns of Berlin, Calais, Middlesex, East Montpelier, and Worcester, and students from Orange, Washington, and Roxbury can choose attend U-32 after middle school. It encompasses grades seven through twelve in a combined middle and senior high school.

U32 Chronicle 

The school paper is the U-32 Chronicle.

The paper is mostly read by the parents of students and by administrators, as well as non-authoring students.

It publishes articles written by students including opinion pieces and satire.

Recognition 
 Boys Division II soccer state champions 2008. This was the third championship in four years.
 The U-32 Debate Team won state championship in 2011 and went to the National Debate Tournament
 The U-32 Girls Nordic Ski team - state championship 2008 - 2009. This title is the first in the school's history.
 The U-32 Girls Ice Hockey Team -  state champions 2009-2010
 The U-32 Football team went undefeated in 2006, allowing less than 50 points all season and scoring more than 400. This year marked a record number of VT-NH Shrine Bowl participants for a single year coming from the school: Marcus Hass, Robert (Bob) Fitch, Silas Dowen, Todd Murphy, and Robert Keene
 U-32 sports are covered by the Zoo Sports Network, a platform dedicated entirely to Raider athletics.
 Boys Division II baseball state champions 2021.
 The U-32 Boys Cross Country Team won New Englands in 2021, the second team from Vermont to do so and the first from Vermont's Second division. They later went on to place 7th at NXN Nike Cross National Qualifiers for the Northeast region.

Notable graduates 

 Frank Miller - 1975 comic-book writer and artist  Miller became a professional comic book artist while in his teens, working on a variety of assignments for major publishers, including Gold Key, DC and Marvel.
 Sydney Perry - Beauty queen holding the Miss Vermont Teen USA 2008 and Miss North Carolina USA 2012 titles.
 Owen Kellington - Professional baseball pitcher drafted by the Pittsburgh Pirates in round 4 of the 2021 MLB Draft.

Principals 
 William Grady 1971-1972 (Mr. Grady resigned his position after serving 1 year of his 2 year contract - resigned May 12, 1972)
 James Dawson 1972-1976 
 Alan Weiss 1976-1979
 Lyman Amsden 1979-1986
 Paul Lissandrello 1986-1988
 John Coolidge 1988-1996
 Inga Duktig 1996-2000
 Dorothy Blake 2000-2006
 Keith Gerritt 2006-2013
 Steve Dellinger-Pate 2013-present

Washington Central Supervisory Union (WCSU) Superintendents List 
  1971-1973 Charles Johnson – our school districts combined with WNSU which was Cabot & Twinfield
  1973-1977 Robert Grogan (WCSU formed in 1973)
  1977-1980 Robert Arlin
  1981-1983 Alice Angney, Acting Superintendent 
  1983-1986 Alice Angney
  1986-1991 Lyman Amsden
  1991-1994 George Olive
  1995-1997 Philip Hyjek, (Transitional Leadership Compact - UVM)
  1997-2012 Robbe Brook
  2012-2019 William Kimball
  2019-2020 Debra Taylor, Interim Superintendent
  2020-2021 Bryan Olkowski
  2021-2022 Jennifer Miller-Arsenault, Interim Superintendent
  2022-present Meagan Roy (assumes position 7/01/2022)

References

External links 
 U32 School Website

Public high schools in Vermont
Buildings and structures in East Montpelier, Vermont
Schools in Washington County, Vermont